Robert Santavy (born 27 October 1947) is a Canadian weightlifter. He competed in the men's heavyweight event at the 1976 Summer Olympics.

References

1947 births
Living people
Canadian male weightlifters
Olympic weightlifters of Canada
Weightlifters at the 1976 Summer Olympics
People from Saint Boniface, Winnipeg
Sportspeople from Winnipeg
Commonwealth Games medallists in weightlifting
Commonwealth Games silver medallists for Canada
Commonwealth Games bronze medallists for Canada
Pan American Games medalists in weightlifting
Pan American Games bronze medalists for Canada
Weightlifters at the 1975 Pan American Games
Weightlifters at the 1970 British Commonwealth Games
Weightlifters at the 1978 Commonwealth Games
20th-century Canadian people
21st-century Canadian people
Medallists at the 1970 British Commonwealth Games
Medallists at the 1978 Commonwealth Games